The dearMoon project is a lunar tourism mission and art project conceived and financed by Japanese billionaire Yusaku Maezawa. It will make use of a SpaceX Starship spacecraft on a private spaceflight flying a single circumlunar trajectory around the Moon. The passengers will be Maezawa and eight other civilians, and there may be one or two crew members. The project was unveiled in September 2018 and was scheduled to launch in 2023. The project objective is to have eight passengers travel with Maezawa for free around the Moon on a six-day tour. Maezawa expects that the experience of space tourism will inspire the accompanying passengers in the creation of something new. The art would be exhibited some time after returning to Earth to help promote peace around the world.

Maezawa had previously contracted in 2017 with SpaceX for a lunar flyby in a much smaller Dragon 2 spacecraft launched by a Falcon Heavy launch vehicle, which would have carried only two passengers. According to a SpaceX announcement in early 2018, the Falcon Heavy plan was shelved in light of the development of Starship.

History 

On February 27, 2017, SpaceX announced that they were planning to fly two space tourists on a free-return trajectory around the Moon, now known to be billionaire Yusaku Maezawa, and one friend. This mission, which would have launched in late 2018, was planned to use the Crew Dragon 2 capsule already developed under contract for NASA's Commercial Crew Program and launched via a Falcon Heavy rocket. As well as being a source of income for the company, any mission would serve as technology development for SpaceX's further plans to colonize Mars. 

At the time of the 2017 announcement, the Crew Dragon 2 capsule was still under development and the Falcon Heavy had yet to fly. Industry analysts noted that the schedule proposed by SpaceX might be too ambitious, as the capsule was expected to need modifications to handle differences in flight profile between the proposed lunar flight and its main use for crew transfer to space stations orbiting Earth.

In February 2018, SpaceX announced it no longer had plans to certify the Falcon Heavy for human spaceflight and that lunar missions would be flown on Starship (then called BFR). Then, on September 14, 2018, SpaceX announced that the previously contracted passenger would be launched aboard Starship to flyby the Moon in 2023.

Crew 
The project was announced in 2018 with the original intent to bring a crew of artists to the Moon. In this latest release, Maezawa calls for applicants to make up a crew of eight individuals from around the world for the week-long lunar trip.

On February 7, 2019, the dearMoon YouTube channel posted a video in which Maezawa discusses the movie First Man with director Damien Chazelle and lead actor Ryan Gosling. In the video, Maezawa officially invites Chazelle to come with him on his dearMoon project, making Chazelle the first person to be publicly invited to go. However, Chazelle answered that he had to think about it and discuss it with his wife. On March 3, 2021, Yusaku Maezawa announced that eight members of the public will be selected to fly on dearMoon. On July 16, 2021, Yuzaku Maezawa uploaded a video that reveals 1 million people have joined, but there was still no information on who won the 8 seats.

On December 8, 2022, the crew of the mission was announced, along with two backup crew members.
Primary crew

Backup crew

Objective
The dearMoon project passengers will be Yusaku Maezawa and eight accomplished artists that Maezawa has invited to travel with him for free.  Maezawa expects this flight to inspire the artists in their creation of new art, which will be presented some time after their return to Earth. He hopes this project will help promote peace around the world.

Mission profile 
Initially proposed to launch in 2023, the circumlunar mission is expected to take 6 days to complete. In 1970, Apollo 13 followed a similar trajectory around the Moon. During the 2020s NASA's Artemis 2 is expected to launch on similar trajectories, while Artemis 1 entered a distant retrograde orbit around the Moon for 6 days. The circumlunar Artemis 2 mission is planned to be crewed and to be launched in 2024.

See also 

 Artemis 2
 Exploration of the Moon
 List of missions to the Moon
 Polaris program
 Tourism on the Moon

References

External links 
 

SpaceX human spaceflights
Crewed missions to the Moon
Missions to the Moon
Tourism on Moon
Lunar flybys
Space tourism
2023 in spaceflight
Future human spaceflights